Frederick Solon Lovell (November 1, 1813May 14, 1878) was an American lawyer and politician. He was the 11th Speaker of the Wisconsin State Assembly, was a delegate to both Wisconsin constitutional conventions, and was a Union Army officer in the American Civil War.

Biography
Lovell was born on November 1, 1813, in Bennington, Vermont. He graduated from Hobart College before moving to Southport, in the Wisconsin Territory (now Kenosha, Wisconsin) in 1837 and practicing law. Lovell died on May 14, 1878.

Political career
Lovell served in the two Wisconsin Constitutional Conventions in 1846 and 1848 as a Representative of Racine County, which at the time comprised all of the territory of modern-day Racine and Kenosha counties. He also served in the Wisconsin Territorial Council during the final years of the Territory. Ten years later, after Kenosha County separated from Racine, Lovell was elected to represent Kenosha County in the Wisconsin State Assembly for the 1857 and 1858 sessions.  He was elected Speaker for the 1858 session. He was a Republican.

Military career
Lovell joined the Union Army in August 1862 during the American Civil War and was commissioned Lieutenant Colonel for the 33rd Wisconsin Volunteer Infantry Regiment as it was organized in Racine, Wisconsin.  The 33rd Wisconsin participated in the Western Theater of the American Civil War as a component of General Ulysses S. Grant's Army of the Tennessee.  After the Vicksburg campaign, the 33rd's commander, Colonel Jonathan Baker Moore, was moved up to command the brigade and, later, the division, leaving Lt. Colonel Lovell in command of the regiment through most of 1863 and 1864, including their part in the Battle of Nashville, in December 1864.

In January 1865, Lovell was promoted to Colonel and given command of the newly organized 46th Wisconsin Volunteer Infantry Regiment.  The 46th Wisconsin did not see combat and served solely in defense of logistics and supply lines until the end of the war.  Lovell was mustered out of the volunteers on September 27, 1865. On January 13, 1866, President Andrew Johnson nominated Lovell for a brevet to brigadier general of volunteers, effective from October 11, 1865.  The United States Senate confirmed the appointment on March 12, 1866.

References

Further reading

External links
 

|-

|-

People from Bennington, Vermont
Politicians from Kenosha, Wisconsin
Members of the Wisconsin Territorial Legislature
People of Wisconsin in the American Civil War
Union Army colonels
Wisconsin lawyers
Hobart and William Smith Colleges alumni
1813 births
1878 deaths
19th-century American politicians
Speakers of the Wisconsin State Assembly
Republican Party members of the Wisconsin State Assembly
19th-century American lawyers